Longaricum was an ancient Roman city in Sicily. It was on the inland road from Lilybaeum (modern Marsala) to Panormus (modern Palermo). Its precise location is not known with certainty, but current scholarship locates it tentatively near Camporeale.

References

Ancient cities in Sicily
Roman towns and cities in Italy
Lost ancient cities and towns
Former populated places in Italy